The 2005 FIFA Beach Soccer World Cup was an international beach soccer tournament held in Rio de Janeiro, Brazil from 8 May until 15 May 2005. The 12 national teams involved in the tournament were required to register a squad of 12 players; only players in these squads were eligible to take part in the tournament.

Group A

Head coach:  Indio

Spain
Head coach:  Joaquín Alonso

Thailand 

Head coach :
 Marcelo Martins

Group B

Japan
Head coach:  Ruy Ramos

Portugal
Head coach: Jose Miguel Mateus

United States
Head coach: Roberto Ceciliano

Group C

South Africa
Head coach: Shezi Lindani

Ukraine
Head coach:  Viktor Moroz

Uruguay
Head coach: Enrique Belo & Gustavo Sanchez

Group D

Argentina
Head coach: Marcelo Suarez Bidondo

Australia
Head coach: Adrian Santrac

France
Head coach:  Eric Cantona

Sources
FIFA Squad Lists 2005

Squads
Beach soccer tournament squads